Matatā is a town in the Bay of Plenty in the North Island of New Zealand,  to the north-west of Whakatāne.  Much of the town was relocated between the years 2006 and 2021 due to increased natural threats arising from climate change.  As an example of forced retreat, Matatā is seen as providing lessons for future actions elsewhere.

History and culture

Recent history
In 2005 the town was inundated by two debris flows from the Awatarariki and Waitepuru Streams that devastated a number of buildings, but did not cause any casualties.  The debris flows were caused by a band of intense rain, at a rate of over 2 mm per minute, that fell into the catchments southwest of Matatā, dislodging a huge amount of debris that had built up behind a temporary dam.

From January 2005 the area was subject to hundreds of shallow, low intensity earthquakes, with the most intense swarms occurring in 2005 and 2007, but continuing to at least February 2009. The largest event was of magnitude  4.2 in May 2007.

In 2019, the name of the town was officially gazetted as "Matatā".

Forced retreat under climate change

As a result of the 2005 landslides, Whakatāne District Council began to plan for a managed retreat over the next decade.  The vast majority of residents accepted the need to relocate and did so with council assistance and compensation but  one resident has rejected both the process and the need to move and is now the township's sole remaining occupant.  NIWA coastal hazards expert, Rob Bell, says the general issue of forced retreat is primarily sociopolitical rather than technocratic.

Marae

Matatā has four marae:

 Iramoko Marae	and Te Paetata meeting house, affiliated with the Ngāti Awa hapū of Te Tāwera.
 Ngāti Umutahi Marae and Umutahi meeting house, affiliated with the Ngāti Tūwharetoa hapū of Ngāti Iramoko, Ngāti Umutahi and Te Tāwera.
 Ōniao Marae Tūwharetoa meeting house, affiliated with the Ngāti Tūwharetoa hapū of Ngāi Tamarangi, Ngāti Umutahi and Ngāti Manuwhare.
 Rangitihi Marae and Rangiaohia meeting house is affiliated with Ngāti Rangitihi.

In October 2020, the Government committed $1,646,820 from the Provincial Growth Fund to upgrade Rangitihi Marae and five other local marae, creating 10 jobs.

Demographics
Matatā is part of the larger Matatā-Otakiri statistical area.

Matatā had a population of 678 at the 2018 New Zealand census, an increase of 30 people (4.6%) since the 2013 census, and an increase of 39 people (6.1%) since the 2006 census. There were 249 households, comprising 333 males and 348 females, giving a sex ratio of 0.96 males per female, with 138 people (20.4%) aged under 15 years, 99 (14.6%) aged 15 to 29, 294 (43.4%) aged 30 to 64, and 147 (21.7%) aged 65 or older.

Ethnicities were 62.4% European/Pākehā, 56.6% Māori, 3.5% Pacific peoples, 3.5% Asian, and 0.9% other ethnicities. People may identify with more than one ethnicity.

Although some people chose not to answer the census's question about religious affiliation, 46.9% had no religion, 40.7% were Christian, 3.1% had Māori religious beliefs, 0.4% were Muslim, 0.4% were Buddhist and 1.3% had other religions.

Of those at least 15 years old, 63 (11.7%) people had a bachelor's or higher degree, and 144 (26.7%) people had no formal qualifications. 72 people (13.3%) earned over $70,000 compared to 17.2% nationally. The employment status of those at least 15 was that 234 (43.3%) people were employed full-time, 72 (13.3%) were part-time, and 27 (5.0%) were unemployed.

Matatā-Otakiri statistical area

Matatā-Otakiri had a population of 1,737 at the 2018 New Zealand census, an increase of 66 people (3.9%) since the 2013 census, and an increase of 129 people (8.0%) since the 2006 census. There were 618 households, comprising 861 males and 876 females, giving a sex ratio of 0.98 males per female. The median age was 41.3 years (compared with 37.4 years nationally), with 378 people (21.8%) aged under 15 years, 279 (16.1%) aged 15 to 29, 801 (46.1%) aged 30 to 64, and 279 (16.1%) aged 65 or older.

Ethnicities were 74.8% European/Pākehā, 35.4% Māori, 1.7% Pacific peoples, 4.0% Asian, and 1.4% other ethnicities. People may identify with more than one ethnicity.

The percentage of people born overseas was 11.4, compared with 27.1% nationally.

Although some people chose not to answer the census's question about religious affiliation, 53.7% had no religion, 34.4% were Christian, 2.4% had Māori religious beliefs, 0.2% were Hindu, 0.2% were Muslim, 0.2% were Buddhist and 1.6% had other religions.

Of those at least 15 years old, 174 (12.8%) people had a bachelor's or higher degree, and 291 (21.4%) people had no formal qualifications. The median income was $31,100, compared with $31,800 nationally. 213 people (15.7%) earned over $70,000 compared to 17.2% nationally. The employment status of those at least 15 was that 666 (49.0%) people were employed full-time, 234 (17.2%) were part-time, and 60 (4.4%) were unemployed.

Education

Matata School is a decile 5 state primary school with a roll of  students. St Joseph's Catholic School is a decile 2 integrated primary school with a roll of  students. Both schools are coeducational and cater for years 1–8. Rolls are as of

References

External links
2001 Census information

Whakatane District
Populated places in the Bay of Plenty Region